The Tolpuddle Martyrs' Festival and Rally is an annual festival held in the village of Tolpuddle, in Dorset, England, which celebrates the memory of the Tolpuddle Martyrs. The event is a celebration of trade unionism and labour politics organised by the Dorset Committee of the National Union of Agricultural and Allied Workers, now a section of Unite the Union, and the Trades Union Congress (TUC). The festival is usually held in the third week of July, and features a parade of banners from many trade unions, a memorial service, speeches and music.

Each year a wreath is laid at the grave of James Hammett, one of the martyrs, in the churchyard of Tolpuddle parish church.

The main festival events are held outside the Martyrs' Museum on the western edge of Tolpuddle village. The main speeches and performances take place on a small stage in front of the  Tolpuddle cottages and museum, with audience space on the green. The adjacent field, as well as having camping space, has a marquee, Workers Beer Company bar and merchandise stalls.

Musicians include Billy Bragg, now an (almost) annual fixture, Dick Gaughan, David Rovics and Graham Moore. The UK Youth Parliament and Dorset Youth Council run youth debates annually also.

See also
Durham Miners' Gala
Labour festival

References

External links
Tolpuddle Martyrs' Museum
History of the festival, Tolpuddle Martyrs' Museum

Festivals in Dorset
Labour movement in the United Kingdom
British trade unions history
Political events in the United Kingdom
Labour festivals
National Union of Agricultural and Allied Workers